The 1963 Texas Longhorns football team represented the University of Texas at Austin in the 1963 NCAA University Division football season.  The Longhorns won their first national championship. Tommy Nobis was the only sophomore starter, and was an important participant on the Longhorns' 1963 team, which defeated #2 Navy led by Heisman Trophy winner Roger Staubach in the 1964 Cotton Bowl Classic, 28–6.

Schedule
After defeating Baylor in their eighth game, the Longhorns became the only major team with no losses and no ties in college football. After defeating their first nine opponents, the Longhorns clinched the Southwestern Conference title and a spot in the Cotton Bowl. The Longhorns ended up finishing the regular season with a 10–0 record and defeated #2 Navy in the 1964 Cotton Bowl Classic, 28–6. Texas was the consensus national champion before the game with #2 Navy, regardless of the outcome because the AP Poll and UPI Poll did not release polls after bowl games until years later. However, the win ensured that there would be no dispute as had happened in other years when #1 teams lost their bowl games.

Game summaries

at Tulane

vs. Texas Tech

vs. Oklahoma State

vs. Oklahoma

at Arkansas

vs. Rice

at SMU

vs. Baylor

vs. TCU

at Texas A&M

vs. Navy (Cotton Bowl)

Rankings

1963 Longhorns in the NFL
The following players were drafted into professional football following the season.

Ernie Koy, Jr. and Olen Underwood would be selected in the 1964 NFL Draft, while Tommy Nobis would be selected in the 1965 NFL Draft.

Awards and honors
Scott Appleton, Tackle, Outland Trophy
Scott Appleton, Consensus All-American

Notes

References

Texas
Texas Longhorns football seasons
College football national champions
Southwest Conference football champion seasons
Cotton Bowl Classic champion seasons
College football undefeated seasons
Texas Longhorns football